Blainville station is a commuter rail station operated by Exo in Blainville, Quebec, Canada. It is served by  the Saint-Jérôme line.

The station is located in ARTM fare zone C, and currently has 576 parking spaces. Prior to the reform of the ARTM's fare structure in July 2022, it was in zone 6.

Origin of name 
The station is named after the city of Blainville, Quebec, in which it is located.

Location 
The station is located at  38, boul. De la Seigneurie Est in Blainville.

Connecting bus routes

CIT Laurentides

References

External links 
  Blainville Commuter Train Station Information (RTM)
 Blainville Commuter Train Station Schedule (RTM)
 CIT Laurentides

Exo commuter rail stations
Railway stations in Laurentides
Blainville, Quebec
Railway stations in Canada opened in 1997
1997 establishments in Quebec